Haroon Yousaf was born on 10 November 1973 in Mandi Bahauddin. He was the former Pakistan national football team captain and was capped 53 times and scored 3 goals in his international career. The versatile footballer played as a defender or midfielder.

Career
Yousaf started his career at Pakistan Railways FC in 1990. He transferred to WAPDA FC the following season and stayed there for five years. In 1995, he moved to ABL FC where he became captain. He retired in 2003. 

He has been a winner of the national football championship 4 times and runner up on 4 occasions. He also won the PFF Cup 4 times and was runner up once. Yousaf also played a short while for Afghan FC where he is still highly praised as a solid player and leader.

Yousaf was the captain of PMC Club Athletico Faisalabad.

On 19 March 2021 it was announced that Haroon Yousuf has been named as member of the selection committee for national football team.

Honours

With WAPDA FC
Pakistan Premier League 1991

With ABL FC
Pakistan Premier League 1997(1), 1999, 2000

With ABL FC
Pakistan National Football Challenge Cup 1996, 1998, 1999, 2002

External links
Background

1973 births
Living people
Pakistani footballers
Pakistan international footballers
WAPDA F.C. players
Afghan FC Chaman players
Footballers at the 2002 Asian Games
Association football defenders
Asian Games competitors for Afghanistan